The 1997–98 NBA season was the Mavericks' 18th season in the National Basketball Association. In the off-season, the Mavericks acquired three-point specialist Dennis Scott from the Orlando Magic, and signed free agent Hubert Davis. After winning their first three games of the season, the Mavericks struggled once again losing ten straight in November. Head coach Jim Cleamons was fired, and replaced with General Manager Don Nelson after a 4–12 start. Along the way, forward A.C. Green broke the NBA's Iron Man record of most consecutive games played, breaking Randy Smith's record, which was 906 consecutive games. After winning their first game under Nelson, which was a 105–91 home victory over the New York Knicks on December 4, the Mavericks traveled to Mexico City, Mexico, where they lost to the Houston Rockets 108–106 on December 6, 1997, which was the first NBA regular season game played in Mexico.

The Mavericks posted a 15-game losing streak between December and January, which led to a dreadful 5–27 start, then later holding a 9–38 record at the All-Star break. Players like Shawn Bradley, Robert Pack, Kurt Thomas and second-year forward Samaki Walker all missed large parts of the season with injuries. At midseason, the team traded Scott to the Phoenix Suns in exchange for Cedric Ceballos, who only played just 12 games before sitting out the remainder of the season with a knee injury. The team also signed free agent Shawn Respert, who was previously released by the Toronto Raptors. The Mavericks played .500 basketball posting an 8–8 record in March, but then lost eight of their final nine games, finishing fifth in the Midwest Division with a 20–62 record.

Michael Finley averaged 21.5 points, 5.3 rebounds, 4.9 assists and 1.6 steals per game, and finished tied in fourth place in Most Improved Player voting, while Bradley averaged 11.4 points, 8.1 rebounds and 3.3 blocks per game, and Davis contributed 11.1 points per game. In addition, Walker provided the team with 8.9 points and 7.4 rebounds per game in only just 41 games, while Khalid Reeves contributed 8.7 points per game, second-year guard Erick Strickland contributed 7.6 points per game, and Green provided with 7.3 points and 8.1 rebounds per game. Following the season, Thomas signed as a free agent with the New York Knicks, while second-year forward Martin Muursepp was traded to the Phoenix Suns, and Respert was released to free agency.

One notable highlight of the season was a game against the 2-time defending champion Chicago Bulls at the United Center on December 29, 1997, where Mavericks rookie guard Bubba Wells fouled out of the game in just three minutes, which was an NBA record for fouling out in the shortest amount of time. Nelson used a strategy for Wells to foul Bulls forward and rebound-specialist Dennis Rodman, who is known as a poor free throw shooter. However, the plan backfired as Rodman shot 9–12 from the foul line, and the Bulls defeated the Mavericks, 111–105. The Bulls would go on to defeat the Utah Jazz in six games in the NBA Finals for their third consecutive championship, and sixth overall in eight years.

Offseason

Draft picks

Roster

Roster Notes
 Center Shawn Bradley holds both American and German citizenship.
 Rookie power forward Ace Custis missed the entire season with a torn ACL, and never played for the Mavericks.

Regular season

Season standings

z - clinched division title
y - clinched division title
x - clinched playoff spot

Record vs. opponents

Game log

Player statistics

Awards and records

Transactions

References

See also
 1997-98 NBA season

Dallas Mavericks seasons
Dallas
Dallas
Dallas